Casian Augustin Maghici (born 5 May 1984) is a Romanian former footballer who played as a defender for teams such as Apulum Alba Iulia, FC Brașov (1936), FCM Târgu Mureș, Victoria Brănești or Crișul Chișineu-Criș, among others.

References

External links
 
 

1984 births
Living people
Sportspeople from Arad, Romania
Romanian footballers
Association football defenders
Liga I players
Liga II players
Liga III players
CS ACU Arad players
FC Brașov (1936) players
CS Brănești players
CSM Unirea Alba Iulia players
CSU Voința Sibiu players
FC Botoșani players
ASA 2013 Târgu Mureș players
CS Șoimii Pâncota players
CS Corvinul Hunedoara players
CS Crișul Chișineu-Criș players